Behrouaz Afshar is an Iranian football defender who plays for Baadraan Tehran  in the Azadegan League.

Club career
Former Aboumoslem Academy product joined Gaz Sarakhs in 2006 with 5 years contract. He moved to Siah Jamegan in summer 2011 after his contract expiration with Gaz Sarakhs. He made his professional debut for Siah Jamegan on August 7, 2015, against Esteghlal Ahvaz as a starter.

Club career statistics

References

External links
 Behrouz Afshar at IranLeague.ir

1985 births
Living people
Iranian footballers
Association football defenders
Siah Jamegan players
Khooshe Talaei players
Sportspeople from Mashhad